I Got a Name is the fifth and final studio album and first posthumous release by American singer-songwriter, Jim Croce, released on December 1, 1973. It features the ballad "I'll Have to Say I Love You in a Song", which reached number 9 in the US singles chart, and the ballad "Salon and Saloon", the last song Croce recorded in his lifetime. The song was written by his guitarist Maury Muehleisen and was included on the album as a gift to the writer. The song is noted for its sparse piano-only vocal backing. This would be Croce's final album, as Croce died in a plane crash on September 20, 1973, the day before the album's title song was released, leaving wife Ingrid Croce and son Adrian J. Croce. The title track, the theme from the film The Last American Hero, was another posthumous hit for Croce, reaching number 10 in the US singles chart.

Track listing
All tracks are written by Jim Croce, unless stated otherwise:

Personnel
Jim Croce – guitar, vocals, backing vocals
Additional musicians
Leroy Brown – backing vocals on "Five Short Minutes"
Gary Chester – drums on "I'll Have to Say I Love You in a Song"
George Devens – percussion
Steve Gadd – drums
Ellie Greenwich – backing vocals on "Top Hat Bar and Grille"
Michael Kamen – ARP synthesizer and oboe on "The Hard Way Every Time"; ARP tuba synthesizer on "Workin' at the Car Wash Blues"
Joe Macho – bass
Rick Marotta – drums, percussion
Bobby Matos – percussion
Terence P. Minogue – strings, backing vocals on "The Hard Way Every Time"
Maury Muehleisen – lead acoustic guitar, backing vocals
Henry Gross – lead and rhythm electric guitar on "Five Short Minutes", slide guitar on "Workin' at the Car Wash Blues"
Marty Nelson – backing vocals
Alan Rolnick – guitar, backing vocals
Tasha Thomas – backing vocals
Tommy West – bass, piano, electric piano, backing vocals
Stu Woods – bass

Chart positions

Weekly charts

Year-end charts

Singles

Certifications

References

Jim Croce albums
1973 albums
Albums published posthumously
albums produced by Terry Cashman
ABC Records albums
Vertigo Records albums